Libanus may refer to:

 Mount Lebanon, also known as the Lebanon Mountains, the ancient name for which was Libanus
 Libanus, Powys, a village in the Brecon Beacons National Park, in the county of Powys, Wales, United Kingdom
 Libanus (mythology), a character in Greek mythology

See also 
 Libanus Chapel (disambiguation)